The 2020 United States House of Representatives elections in Minnesota was held on November 3, 2020, to elect the eight U.S. representatives from the state of Minnesota, one from each of its congressional districts. Primary elections were held in six districts on August 11. The elections coincided with the 2020 United States presidential election as well as other elections to the House of Representatives, elections to the United States Senate and other state and local elections.

Due to changing political alignments, the Republican Party flipped the 7th district, which was held by 15-term incumbent Democrat Collin Peterson. This marked the first time since the 1944 election that Republicans won every district in Minnesota outside the Twin Cities metropolitan area, after Democrats had done the same just four years prior. This subsequently erased the slim Democratic majority in the state congressional delegation and gave both political parties a tied 4–4 delegation.

Overview

District 1

The 1st district stretches across southern Minnesota from its borders with South Dakota to Wisconsin, and includes the cities of Rochester, Mankato, Winona, Austin, Owatonna, Albert Lea, New Ulm, and Worthington. The incumbent was Republican Jim Hagedorn, who flipped the district and was elected with 50.1% of the vote in 2018.

Republican primary

Candidates

Nominee
Jim Hagedorn, incumbent U.S. Representative

Democratic primary

Candidates

Nominee
Dan Feehan, U.S. Army veteran, former U.S. Department of Defense official, and nominee for Minnesota's 1st congressional district in 2018

Withdrawn
Ralph Kaehler, farmer

Endorsements

Grassroots—Legalize Cannabis

Candidates

Nominee
Bill Rood

General election

Polling

with Generic Republican and Generic Democrat

Predictions

Results

District 2

The 2nd district is based in the south Twin Cities area. The incumbent was Democrat Angie Craig, who defeated incumbent Republican Jason Lewis with 52.7% of the vote in 2018.

After Legal Marijuana Now Party candidate Adam Charles Weeks died on September 21, 2020, Minnesota Secretary of State Steve Simon announced that, pursuant to state law, the votes in the November election would not be counted and that a special election would take place on February 9, 2021. A judge later ruled that the election would take place on November 3, as originally planned. Although Republicans appealed the decision, it stood after the United States Supreme Court refused to hear the appeal.

A month after Weeks's death, and a week before the November 3 election, a friend of Weeks publicized a voicemail recording in which Weeks says that Republican donors offered him $15,000 to mount a campaign in order to siphon votes away from Craig. Jeff Schuette, Minnesota Republican Party chair for the Second District, denied involvement in the offer to fund Weeks's campaign.

Democratic primary

Candidates

Nominee
Angie Craig, incumbent U.S. Representative

Endorsements

Republican primary

Candidates

Nominee
Tyler Kistner, former Marine

Withdrawn
Regina Barr, former state representative
Erika Cashin, U.S. Air Force veteran
Edward Moritz
Rick Olson, former Michigan state representative
Phillip Parrish, U.S. Naval Intelligence Officer
Kerry Zeiler

Declined
John Howe, former state senator and nominee for Minnesota Secretary of State in 2018
Jason Lewis, former U.S. Representative (running for U.S. Senate)
Eric Pratt, state senator (running for re-election to the MN Senate) 
Doug Wardlow, former state representative and nominee for Minnesota Attorney General in 2018

Endorsements

General election

Polling

Generic Democrat vs. generic Republican

Predictions

Results

District 3

The 3rd district encompasses the western suburbs of the Twin Cities, including Brooklyn Park, Coon Rapids to the northeast, Bloomington to the south, and Eden Prairie, Edina, Maple Grove, Plymouth, Minnetonka, and Wayzata to the west. The incumbent was Democrat Dean Phillips, who defeated incumbent Republican Erik Paulsen with 55.6% of the vote in 2018.

Democratic primary

Candidates

Nominee
Dean Phillips, incumbent U.S. Representative

Eliminated in primary
Cole Young

Primary results

Republican primary

Candidates

Nominee
Kendall Qualls, businessman

Eliminated in primary
Leslie Davis

Primary results

General election

Predictions

Results

District 4

The 4th district encompasses the Saint Paul half of the Twin Cities metro area, including Ramsey County and parts of Washington County. The incumbent was Democrat Betty McCollum, who was reelected with 66.0% of the vote in 2018.

Democratic primary

Candidates

Nominee
Betty McCollum, incumbent U.S. Representative

Eliminated in primary
Alberder Gillespie
Tiffini Flynn Forslund
Reid Rossell
David Sandbeck, activist

Primary results

Republican primary

Candidates

Nominee
Gene Rechtzigel, farmer

Eliminated in primary
 Sia Lo, former deputy city attorney

Primary results

Grassroots—Legalize Cannabis primary

Candidates

Nominee
Susan Sindt, LMN candidate for Minnesota's 4th congressional district in 2016 and 2018

Primary results

General election

Predictions

Results

District 5

The 5th district encompasses eastern Hennepin County, including all of Minneapolis and the cities of St. Louis Park, Richfield, Crystal, Robbinsdale, Golden Valley, New Hope, and Fridley. The incumbent was Democrat Ilhan Omar, who was elected with 78.0% of the vote in 2018.

Democratic primary
Omar defeated Melton-Meaux in the primary by a significant margin, a win which was seen as unsurprising, as the 5th has a reputation as being a strong base of progressivism.

Candidates

Nominee
Ilhan Omar, incumbent U.S. Representative

Eliminated in primary
Antone Melton-Meaux, attorney
Daniel Patrick McCarthy
John Mason, activist
Les Lester, author and teacher

Withdrawn
 Ervan Katari Miller
Leila Shukri Adan (endorsed Melton-Meaux) 
Haji Yussuf  (endorsed Omar)

Endorsements

Polling

Primary results

Republican primary

Candidates

Nominee
Lacy Johnson, former IT consultant

Eliminated in primary
Dalia al-Aqidi, journalist
Danielle Stella, teacher

Endorsements

Primary results

Legal Marijuana Now primary

Candidates

Nominee
 Michael Moore

Primary results

General election

Predictions

Results

District 6

The 6th district encompasses the northern suburbs and exurbs of Minneapolis, including all of Benton, Sherburne, and Wright counties and parts of Anoka, Carver, Stearns, and Washington counties. The incumbent was Republican Tom Emmer, who was reelected with 61.1% of the vote in 2018.

Republican primary

Candidates

Nominee
Tom Emmer, incumbent U.S. Representative

Eliminated in primary
Patrick Munro, candidate for Minnesota's 6th congressional district in 2016 and 2018

Primary results

Democratic primary

Candidates

Nominee
Tawnja Zahradka, broadcaster and former Ms. Minnesota-America

Primary results

General election

Predictions

Results

District 7

The 7th district covers all but the southern end of rural western Minnesota, and includes the cities of Moorhead, Fergus Falls, Alexandria and Willmar. The incumbent was Democrat Collin Peterson, who was reelected with 52.1% of the vote in 2018.

Democratic primary

Candidates

Nominee
Collin Peterson, incumbent U.S. Representative

Eliminated in primary
Stephen A. Emery, sales representative
Alycia Gruenhagen

Endorsements

Primary results

Republican primary

Candidates

Nominee
Michelle Fischbach, former lieutenant governor of Minnesota and former president of the Minnesota Senate

Eliminated in primary
Noel Collis, gastroenterologist
Dave Hughes, U.S. Air Force veteran and nominee for Minnesota's 7th congressional district in 2016 and 2018
William Louwagie, farmer
Jayesun Sherman, former teacher and former youth pastor

Withdrawn
Joel Novak, U.S. Army veteran

Declined
Jeff Backer, state representative
Scott Van Binsbergen, businessman

Endorsements

Primary results

Grassroots—Legalize Cannabis primary

Candidates

Nominee
Rae Hart Anderson, Republican candidate for U.S. Senate in 2018

Eliminated in primary
Kevin "NeNe" Shores

Primary results

Legalize Marijuana Now primary

Candidates

Nominee
 Slater Johnson

Primary results

General election

Polling

Debates
Complete video of debate, October 5, 2020

Predictions

Results

District 8

The 8th district is based in the Iron Range and home to the city of Duluth. The incumbent was Republican Pete Stauber, who flipped the district and was elected with 50.7% of the vote in 2018.

Republican primary

Candidates

Nominee
Pete Stauber, incumbent U.S. Representative

Eliminated in primary
Harry Robb Welty, former teacher

Primary results

Democratic primary

Candidates

Nominee
Quinn Nystrom, diabetes issues advocate and former Baxter city councilwoman

Withdrawn
Marje Holmstrom-Sabo, software engineer
Soren Sorensen, activist and candidate for Minnesota's 8th congressional district in 2018
 Gaylene Spolarich, former Palisade City Clerk

Declined
Michelle Lee, former news anchor and candidate for Minnesota's 8th congressional district in 2018
Leah Phifer, former federal counterterrorism analyst and candidate for Minnesota's 8th congressional district in 2018
Joe Radinovich, former state representative and nominee for Minnesota's 8th congressional district in 2018
Roger Reinert, former state senator and former state representative

Endorsements

Primary results

Grassroots—Legalize Cannabis primary

Candidates

Nominee
Judith Schwartzbacker, Grassroots nominee for Lieutenant Governor of Minnesota in 2018

Primary results

General election

Predictions

Results

See also
 2020 Minnesota elections

Notes

Partisan clients

References

External links
Elections & Voting - Minnesota Secretary of State
 
 
  (State affiliate of the U.S. League of Women Voters)
 

Official campaign websites for 1st district candidates
 Dan Feehan (D) for Congress 
 Jim Hagedorn (R) for Congress
 Bill Rood (GLC) for Congress

Official campaign websites for 2nd district candidates
 Angie Craig (D) for Congress
 Tyler Kistner (R) for Congress
 Adam Charles Weeks (LMN) for Congress 

Official campaign websites for 3rd district candidates
 Dean Phillips (D) for Congress
 Kendall Qualls (R) for Congress

Official campaign websites for 4th district candidates
 Betty McCollum (D) for Congress
 Gene Rechtzigel (R) for Congress

Official campaign websites for 5th district candidates
 Lacy Johnson (R) for Congress
 Michael Moore (LMN) for Congress
 Ilhan Omar (D) for Congress

Official campaign websites for 6th district candidates
 Tom Emmer (R) for Congress
 Tawnja Zahradka (D) for Congress

Official campaign websites for 7th district candidates
 Michelle Fischbach (R) for Congress
 Collin Peterson (D) for Congress

Official campaign websites for 8th district candidates
 Quinn Nystrom (D) for Congress 
 Pete Stauber (R) for Congress

2020
Minnesota
United States House of Representatives